Birds described in 1894 include  Junin grebe, Ecuadorian rail, Kenrick's starling, helmeted myna, leaf lorikeet, Loria's satinbird, red-throated wood rail , mountain honeyeater, streaked berrypecker, Luzon sunbird

Events 
Death of Karl Theodor Liebe, Ferdinand Heine
The journal Aquila established by Ottó Herman. 
Charles Wallace Richmond becomes Associate Curator of Birds at the Smithsonian Institution.
Horn expedition
William Frederick Henry Rosenberg expedition  to Colombia.

Publications
Joseph Whitaker Notes on some Tunisian birds.Ibis 78–100, map. 1
Hans von Berlepsch  and Jean Stanislaus Stolzmann Descriptions de quelques Espèces nouvelles d'Oiseaux du Perou central. The Ibis 1894. Vol. 6 6th. series no. 23: 385–406.
Adolf Bernhard Meyer and  Lionel William Wiglesworth Ueber eine erste Sammlung von Vögeln von den Talaut Inseln Journal für Ornithologie volume 42:237–253 (1894)
Anton Reichenow Die Vögel Deutsch-Ostafrikas Berlin:Geographische Verlagshandlung Dietrich Reimer,1894.online BHL
Ongoing events
Osbert Salvin and Frederick DuCane Godman 1879–1904. Biologia Centrali-Americana . Aves
Richard Bowdler Sharpe Catalogue of the Birds in the British Museum London,1874-98.
Eugene W. Oates and William Thomas Blanford 1889–1898. The Fauna of British India, Including Ceylon and Burma. Vols. I-IV. Birds.
Anton Reichenow, Jean Cabanis,  and other members of the German Ornithologists' Society in Journal für Ornithologie online BHL
The Ibis
Ornithologische Monatsberichte Verlag von R. Friedländer & Sohn, Berlin.1893–1938 online Zobodat
Ornis; internationale Zeitschrift für die gesammte Ornithologie.Vienna 1885-1905online BHL
The Auk online BHL

References

Bird
Birding and ornithology by year